"Dreams of the Everyday Housewife" is a song written by Chris Gantry and recorded by American country music artist Glen Campbell. It was released in July 1968 as the first single from his album Wichita Lineman. The song peaked at number 3 on the Billboard Hot Country Singles chart. It also reached number 1 on the RPM Country Tracks chart in Canada.

Chart performance

Glen Campbell

Wayne Newton
Wayne Newton recorded a version of the song which reached number 14 on the Easy Listening chart.

Other recordings
Gary Puckett & The Union Gap released a cover version on their album Young Girl.
Mike Minor also performed the song on episode 184 of Petticoat Junction, "The Ballad of the Everyday Housewife".  The show first aired on January 4, 1969.

References

External links
 

1968 songs
1968 singles
Glen Campbell songs
Gary Puckett & The Union Gap songs
Wayne Newton songs
Songs written by Chris Gantry
Capitol Records singles